Mount Minto may refer to:

 Mount Minto, British Columbia, Canada
 Mount Minto (Nunavut), Canada
 Mount Minto in the Admiralty Mountains of Antarctica